Yulin Township is a township under the administration of Yanjin County, Xinxiang, Henan, China. , it has 14 villages under its administration.

References 

Township-level divisions of Henan
Yanjin County, Henan